Michael Forbes (born circa 1952) is a farmer, part-time salmon fisherman and quarry worker from near Balmedie in Aberdeenshire, Scotland, who became known after his refusal to sell his land to Donald Trump for a golf course and resort.

Biography 
Forbes rose to fame for refusing to sell his land to Donald Trump, who was planning to build an extensive luxury golf course complex in the area with assistance from the Scottish First Minister Alex Salmond Forbes's farm, which is said by Trump to be in a state of disrepair, has the words "NO GOLF COURSE" painted on a shed.

Forbes refused Trumps offer of a one-time payment of £450,000 in addition to a yearly salary of £50,000 for an unspecified job. The plans to build the golf complex were rejected in late November 2007 by Aberdeenshire Council but were later called in by the Scottish Government, which approved the project in November 2008. Forbes has been compared to the beachcomber character in the film Local Hero.

The Trump Organization at one point threatened to try to use a compulsory purchase order to forcibly remove him and his family from their land, as well as other nearby residents. Trump claimed that Forbes' property was a slum that would spoil the view from his new hotel. Forbes retorted that Trump can "take his money and shove it up his arse." The Tripping Up Trump Campaign was formed to challenge the Trump Organization on the issue. Hundreds of people bought small interests in Forbes' property and became co-owners, with the intention of making it more difficult to transfer the title to the land.

Awards 
In 2012, Forbes won the 'Top Scot' award at the Glenfiddich Spirit of Scotland Awards, provoking Trump to criticise Glenfiddich, calling it a "terrible embarrassment to Scotland".

In popular culture 
Forbes and his struggle with Trump featured in the 2011 documentary You've Been Trumped, directed by Anthony Baxter and produced by Richard Phinney. His portrait by Alicia Bruce with his wife, Sheila, is held in the National Galleries of Scotland collection. 

Forbes was also featured on the HBO news magazine, Real Sports with Bryant Gumbel.

See also
 Holdout (architecture)
 Wu Ping
 Eminent domain
 Kelo v. City of New London
 Figo House, a real-estate holdout in Oregon
 Edith Macefield, a real-estate holdout in Seattle, Washington
 Vera Coking, a real-estate holdout in Atlantic City, New Jersey

References

1952 births
Living people
Scottish farmers
People from Aberdeenshire
Real estate holdout